The Grudieaire GH-4 is an American autogyro that was designed for homebuilt construction.

Design and development
The GH-4 is a single seat autogyro constructed of welded steel tubing with aircraft fabric covering. The GH-4 uses Timken roller bearings and spruce wood core rotor blades with composite covering.

Variants
Grudieaire GH-4
Homebuilt
Vortech B20

Specifications (GH-4)

See also

References

Homebuilt aircraft
Autogyros